Omiodes spoliatalis is a moth in the family Crambidae. It was described by Julius Lederer in 1863. It was described from North America.

References

Moths described in 1863
spoliatalis